The Best Manufacturing Company (sometimes known as the Daniel Best Company) of San Leandro, California was a manufacturer of farm machinery, known for its steam tractors.

History

The company was formed in 1871 by Daniel Best. The company's initial product was a portable grain cleaner, soon followed by a combine harvester. In 1890, the company purchased the rights to manufacture the Remington steam engine, and produced a range of steam-driven farm machinery, including steam tractors and combine harvesters. Around 1900 the company built a number of three wheeled road locomotives. 

The company was acquired by the Holt Manufacturing Company in 1908 after a legal battle. C. L. Best, the son of the founder then formed his own rival company, the C. L. Best Gas Traction Company which built gasoline-powered tractors. This new company acquired the rights to manufacture the Lombard Steam Log Hauler, an early tracked crawler, and began producing "tracklayer" tractors.

Following fierce competition from the Fordson company, C.L. Best merged with the Holt Manufacturing Company in 1925 to form the Caterpillar Tractor Company.

References

External links
 "Daniel Best Builds His First Steam Traction Engine Tractor". Caterpillar.
 Oakland museum's Best tractor
 Page on Best steam tractors
 The Oakland Best operating in 2005

Tractor manufacturers of the United States
Former Caterpillar Inc. subsidiaries
Companies based in San Leandro, California
Defunct manufacturing companies based in the San Francisco Bay Area
Manufacturing companies established in 1871
Manufacturing companies disestablished in 1925
1871 establishments in California
1925 disestablishments in California
History of San Leandro, California
1925 mergers and acquisitions